The following is a list of people who served in the United States Coast Guard and have gained notability through previous or subsequent endeavors, infamy, or successes:

Note: When adding a name to this list, please place the same in alphabetical order and provide a reliable verifiable source. Secondary sources such as fansites are not allowed. As a guide please see: sources. Additions that are not in alphabetical order and/or do not provide a primary reliable verifiable source will be removed.

A

 John C. Acton – retired rear admiral who serves as the Director of Operations Coordination for DHS. Acton formerly served as Director of the DHS Presidential Transition Team.
 Derroll Adams – folk musician
 Nick Adams – actor (served 1952–1955)
 Eddie Albert – actor and activist
 Thad Allen – former commandant, incident commander for Deep Water Horizon oil spill and Hurricane Katrina disaster recovery operations.
 Gerald Arpino – choreographer

B

 Al Barlick – professional baseball umpire, National Baseball Hall of Fame inductee (served during World War II)
 Edward T. Barry – American professional hockey player
 Panayiota Bertzikis – executive director, Military Rape Crisis Center
 Humphrey Bogart – actor (Bogart volunteered his yacht Santana (as well as himself) in 1944 for service with the Coast Guard Temporary Reserve)
 Corey Brandt – baseball executive and former baseball general manager (served 1996-2000) 
 Milton H. Bren – producer (Tars and Spars), writer, director
 Beau Bridges – actor (served from 1959 to 1967 in the Coast Guard Reserve)
 Jeff Bridges – actor (served from 1967 to 1975 in the Coast Guard Reserve)
 Lloyd Bridges – actor (he was a member of Coast Guard and Coast Guard Auxiliary and did a number of public service announcements for the Coast Guard)
 Frank Brimsek – professional hockey player, National Hockey Hall of Fame inductee (Served from 1943 to 1945)
 Aaron Brown – broadcast journalist, professor of journalism at Arizona State
 Danny Joe Brown – lead singer for the southern rock group Molly Hatchet
 Erroll M. Brown – the first Coast Guard African-American admiral
 Nathan Bruckenthal – the only Coast Guardsman killed in action in Iraq, and the first KIA since the Vietnam War
 Daniel C. Burbank – second Coast Guard astronaut, Captain, USCG

C

 Sid Caesar – comedian
 Richard R. Callahan – Coast Guard Medal recipient
 Gil Carmichael – Mississippi businessman, transportation specialist and politician
 Lou Carnesecca – college basketball coach
 Gower Champion – dancer, actor, director
 Howard Coble – congressman (North Carolina), retired Coast Guard Reserve captain
 Edwin Louis Cole – author, pastor
 Chris Cooper – actor
 Art Coulter – professional hockey player, National Hockey Hall of Fame inductee
 Warren Covington – musician and band leader (took over the Tommy Dorsey Orchestra)
 Richard Cromwell – actor
 Walter Cronkite – newscaster, member of the United States Coast Guard Auxiliary and an honorary commodore

D
 Jim Davis – actor
 William D. Delahunt – congressman (Massachusetts)
 Jack Dempsey – professional boxer
 Vernon Duke – composer

E
 Buddy Ebsen – actor
 Blake Edwards – writer, director, producer
 Perry Ellis – fashion designer
 Edwin D. Eshleman – former U.S. Congressman, Pennsylvania

F

 William R. "Willie" Flores – Coast Guard Medal recipient, namesake of the Sentinel-class cutter USCGC William Flores
 Arthur Fiedler – conductor, Boston Pops Orchestra
 Anton Otto Fischer – artist
 Glenn Ford – actor
 Preston Foster – actor
 William A. Fraker – cinematographer
 Elizebeth Smith Friedman – cryptanalyst for the U.S. Treasury Department and the Coast Guard

G
 Neal Gay – professional Rodeo Hall of Fame inductee
 Charles Gibson – newscaster
 Leroy Gilbert – former officer in the United States Navy and Chaplain of the United States Coast Guard
 Arthur Godfrey – entertainer
 Gale Gordon – actor
 Sid Gordon, – 2-time All-Star Major League Baseball player
 Otto Graham – professional football player and coach
 Burton Gilliam – actor

H

 Alan Hale, Jr. – actor
 Alex Haley – writer
 Wynn Handman – actor, director
 William O. Harbach – producer
 Michael A. Healy – first man of African American descent to command a U.S. Government vessel.
 Jim Hegan – professional baseball player and coach
 Robert Horton – actor
 Tab Hunter – actor

J
 Lew Jenkins – professional boxer and world lightweight champion
 Harvey E. Johnson, Jr. – retired Coast Guard Vice Admiral, Deputy Director of FEMA
 Victor Jory – actor

K
 Robert Kellard – actor
 Michael Kilian – author, writer (USCG auxiliarist)
 Jack Kramer – tennis professional

L
 Al Lamberti - Sheriff of Broward County
 Jacob Lawrence – artist

M

 Guy Madison – actor
 John Mariucci – professional hockey player, National Hockey Hall of Fame inductee
 Monte Markham – actor, producer
 Victor Mature – actor (served in World War II)
 Bruce E. Melnick – NASA astronaut, first Coast Guard astronaut
 G. William Miller – businessman, Secretary of the Treasury
 Bubba Morton – baseball player
 Douglas Munro – the only Coast Guardsman to receive the Medal of Honor
 Frank Murkowski – governor of Alaska and former senator (Alaska)

N

 Frank Newcomb – commodore, USCG and Congressional Gold Medal recipient
 Sam Nunn – former senator (Georgia)

O
 Edwin O'Connor – Pulitzer Prize-winning author
 Thomas F. O'Neil – executive
 Jess Oppenheimer – writer, director, producer of I Love Lucy television show

P
 Arnold Palmer – professional golfer
 Ed Parker – founder of American Kenpo Karate
 George S. Patton, Jr. – awarded the Silver Lifesaving Medal for saving three boys from drowning
 Vincent W. Patton III – first African American to become Master Chief Petty Officer of the Coast Guard
 Claiborne Pell – former senator (Rhode Island)
 J.D. Power III – businessman (served from 1953-1957)
 Ronald C. Prei – Coast Guard Medal recipient

Q
 Richard Quine – actor

R
 Al Roker – television personality, Honorary Commodore, Coast Guard Auxiliary
 Cesar Romero – actor

S

 Walter Sande – actor
 Steve Shagan – Oscar-nominated screenwriter, film and television producer, and novelist
 Charles S. Shapiro – former U.S. Ambassador to Venezuela
 Joe Simon – comic book writer, artist, editor and publisher
 Carlton Skinner – first civilian governor of Guam
 Ron Sparks – Alabama politician
 Ted Steele – radio personality
 Dorothy C. Stratton – first director of the SPARS

T

 Gene Taylor – congressman (Mississippi)
 Emlen Tunnell – professional football player
 Ted Turner – businessman

V

 Rudy Vallée – entertainer, musician, singer

W

 Tom Waits – actor, singer, songwriter
 Patrick Wayne – actor
 Bernard C. Webber – Gold Lifesaving Medal awardee, author
 Henry Wilcoxon – actor
 Don "The Dragon" Wilson – martial arts master, actor
 Sloan Wilson – writer
 Kai Winding – musician
 Lothar Wolff – producer, director

Y

 Gig Young – actor

Z
 Paul F. Zukunft – retired commandant and admiral

Sources
U.S. Coast Guard Historian's Office

References

People
United States Coast Guard
United States Coast Guard personnel